Liberty Hill is an unincorporated community in Williamson County, Tennessee. It is the location of the Liberty Hill School, which is listed on the U.S. National Register of Historic Places.

References

Unincorporated communities in Williamson County, Tennessee
Unincorporated communities in Tennessee